Mariaan de Swardt and Elena Tatarkova were the defending champions, but none competed this year.

Rita Grande and Émilie Loit won the title by defeating Kim Clijsters and Alicia Molik 6–2, 2–6, 6–3 in the final.

Seeds

Draw

Draw

References
 Official results archive (ITF)
 Official results archive (WTA)

Hobart International